Purohito Ka Talab, situated in Udaipur city in the Indian state of Rajasthan, is an artificial fresh water lake. Purohito ka Talab is located at a distance of around 12 kilometres from Udaipur city. The Lake is surrounded by green mountains. Purohito ka Taalab is also called as ‘Mini Jaisamand’. It's situated between the Aravalli Range. One can easily reach Purohito Ka Talab by taxi. Purohito Ka Talab is normally less crowded. In order too preserve the forest life in Purohito ka Taalab, it has been declared as a No Fishing Zone.

Entry fee 
A very nominal entry fees will be charged at the entrance of the lake.

Location 
It's located at 12 KM from the Udaipur main city and Small settlement is located at near the lake.

No Fishing Zone 
Purohito Ka Talab is a No fishing zone to protect the wild life around the lake because its located at near the forest.

Pre-wedding destination 
Purohito Ka Talab is popular for pre-wedding photoshoot. Nominal fees will be charged for bringing camera inside the lake premises.

References 

5. Latest Article on Purohito ka Talab 

Lakes of Udaipur